Robert 'Bob' Boyd Weir (born 4 February 1961 in Birmingham) is a male retired English athlete, best known as a discus thrower, who was a twelve-time national champion. Weir also achieved success in hammer throw, winning Commonwealth Games gold in 1982, and competed in strongman competitions.

His daughter, Jillian Weir, representing Canada, won bronze in the women's hammer at the 2022 Commonwealth Games in Birmingham, England, emulating her father's achievement 20 years before.

Education
Weir attended Handsworth Grammar School in Birmingham. Weir studied at Southern Methodist University in Dallas, Texas attaining a degree in Business Studies in 1983.

Athletics career
His personal best throw was 65.08 metres, achieved in August 2000 in Bedford. This places him fifth among English discus throwers, behind Perriss Wilkins, Richard Slaney, Glen Smith and Carl Myerscough. Weir represented Great Britain in the 1984 Summer Olympics. He represented England in the discus event and won a gold medal in the hammer event, at the 1982 Commonwealth Games in Brisbane, Queensland, Australia. Eight years later he won a bronze medal in the discus at the 1994 Commonwealth Games and followed this up with a gold medal in the discus four years later at the 1998 Commonwealth Games in Kuala Lumpur. He appeared in his final Commonwealth Games at the 2002 Commonwealth Games in Manchester and won a fourth medal in the process; another bronze in the discus.

Weir also competed at the 1997 World's Strongest Man competition, finishing 3rd in a qualifying group of six, only being beaten by Jouko Ahola and Flemming Rasmussen who went on to finish as champion and runner-up respectively in the 1997 final .

International competitions

References

External links

Profile at Sporting Heroes
Youtube 1984 Olympics

1961 births
Living people
Sportspeople from Birmingham, West Midlands
British male discus throwers
English male discus throwers
British male hammer throwers
English male hammer throwers
Olympic athletes of Great Britain
Athletes (track and field) at the 1984 Summer Olympics
Athletes (track and field) at the 1996 Summer Olympics
Athletes (track and field) at the 2000 Summer Olympics
Commonwealth Games gold medallists for England
Commonwealth Games medallists in athletics
Athletes (track and field) at the 1982 Commonwealth Games
Athletes (track and field) at the 1994 Commonwealth Games
Athletes (track and field) at the 1998 Commonwealth Games
Athletes (track and field) at the 2002 Commonwealth Games
Universiade medalists in athletics (track and field)
Birchfield Harriers
People educated at Handsworth Grammar School
Universiade silver medalists for Great Britain
Medalists at the 1983 Summer Universiade
Medallists at the 1982 Commonwealth Games
Medallists at the 1994 Commonwealth Games
Medallists at the 1998 Commonwealth Games
Medallists at the 2002 Commonwealth Games